Mount Choqa (also known as ጮቄ ተራራ (in Ge'ez) Ch'ok'e Terara and Mount Birhan) at , is one of the highest mountains of Debay Telategn Gojjam, a region of Ethiopia located south of Lake Tana. The mountain and its surrounding area lacks forests, and its slopes are cultivated up to an elevation of 3,000 meters above sea level.

See also
 List of Ultras of Africa

References

External links
 "Birhan, Ethiopia" on Peakbagger

Choke
Important Bird Areas of Ethiopia